Justice Stratton may refer to:

Evelyn Lundberg Stratton, associate justice of the Supreme Court of Ohio
Riley E. Stratton, associate justice of the Oregon Supreme Court